Martin Ray Simmons (born February 21, 1965) is an American basketball coach and former player. He is the head men's basketball coach at Eastern Illinois University, a position he has held since 2021. Simmons served as the head men's basketball coach at Wartburg College from 1996 to 1997, Southern Illinois University Edwardsville from 2002 to 2007, and the University of Evansville from  2007 to 2018.  As a high school player, Simmons was named Illinois Mr. Basketball in 1983.  He played college basketball at Indiana University Bloomington and Evansville.

High school
Simmons was born and raised in Lawrenceville, Illinois and attended Lawrenceville High School, graduating in 1983.  While attending high school, Simmons led the Indians to consecutive 34–0 seasons and Illinois High School Association (IHSA) Class A state championships, becoming one of the most celebrated players in Illinois prep history. Because of Simmons' ability to "carry" his team the nickname of "Mule" was given to him during his junior year.  His 2,986 career points were the third most in Illinois history when he graduated in 1983.  Simmons played for coach Ron Felling, who went on to become an assistant coach at Indiana University.

In 2006, Simmons was voted as one of the 100 Legends of the IHSA Boys Basketball Tournament, a group of former players and coaches in honor of the 100th anniversary of the IHSA boys basketball tournament.

College
After high school, Simmons spent his first two years of college playing for Bob Knight and the Indiana Hoosiers. During his freshman year, he was an integral part of the Hoosiers' Elite Eight run in the 1984 NCAA tournament. His 1985 team at Indiana finished second in the National Invitation Tournament (NIT). After Simmons' sophomore year, however, he transferred to the University of Evansville to play for former Indiana assistant coach Jim Crews.  Crews made Simmons the team captain for the Purple Aces, even though he had to redshirt the 1985–86 season.  When Simmons became eligible, he immediately helped turn around the Evansville program. During the 1986–87 season he averaged 22.4 points per game and led Evansville to a first place tie in the Midwestern Collegiate Conference. During his senior year, Simmons finished sixth in the nation in scoring at 25.9 points per game, and finished ninth in balloting for the Associated Press College Basketball Player of the Year. Evansville posted a 21–8 record in 1988 and recorded a first-round win over Utah in the NIT. Simmons was named to the first team all-MCC in both of his seasons at UE.  Despite playing only two seasons at Evansville, Simmons ranks 22nd all-time with 1,265 points.

Coaching career
After graduating from Evansville, Simmons played the 1988–89 season for the La Crosse Catbirds of the Continental Basketball Association. During the 1989–90 season, while playing for the Illinois Express, Simmons made the World Basketball League all-star team.

After being a part-time assistant coach for Evansville from 1990 to 1996, Simmons became the head coach at Wartburg College, an NCAA Division III  school in Waverly, Iowa for the 1996–97 season. Simmons returned to the University of Evansville the next season as a full-time assistant coach, and stayed at Evansville until becoming the head coach at Southern Illinois University Edwardsville in April 2002. In 2007, after five years of coaching while producing a record of 88–59 for the Cougars, Simmons once again returned to Evansville, this time as head coach. He coached the Aces for 11 seasons, compiling a record of 184–175 before being fired following the 2017–18 season. In July 2018, Simmons accepted an assistant coaching position under his longtime friend, Brad Brownell, for the Clemson Tigers. The two coached together at the University of Evansville from 1991 to 1992.

Simmons was hired by Eastern Illinois University on March 31st, 2021 to take over as head coach for the men’s basketball program.

Honors
Simmons was inducted into the Illinois Basketball Coaches Association (IBCA) Hall of Fame in 1994, and the University of Evansville Athletics Hall of Fame in 1997. In 2007, Simmons was voted one of the 100 Legends of the IHSA Boys Basketball Tournament, recognizing his superior performance in his appearances in the tournament.

Head coaching record

References

External links
 Clemson profile
 Evansville profile

1965 births
Living people
American men's basketball coaches
American men's basketball players
Basketball coaches from Illinois
Basketball players from Illinois
College men's basketball head coaches in the United States
Evansville Purple Aces men's basketball coaches
Evansville Purple Aces men's basketball players
Indiana Hoosiers men's basketball players
La Crosse Catbirds players
People from Lawrenceville, Illinois
SIU Edwardsville Cougars men's basketball coaches
Wartburg Knights men's basketball coaches
Eastern Illinois Panthers men's basketball coaches